The Roman Catholic Diocese of Jehol, also known in Chinese as Rehe or Jinzhou, is a diocese in the Ecclesiastical province of Shenyang in China, covering part of the former Rehe Province. Both Jehol and Rehe are forms of the former Chinese name of the city of Chengde; Jinzhou refers to the State of Jin that formerly occupied part of the diocese.

The diocese lost an important part of its territory in 2018, when the entire city of Chengde was taken out to form the Diocese of Chengde, a suffragan of the Archdiocese of Beijing. Now, only the Liaoning part of the diocese remains, along with a very small part of Hebei.

History
 December 21, 1883: Established as Apostolic Vicariate of Eastern Mongolia 東蒙古 from the Apostolic Vicariate of Mongolia 蒙古
 December 3, 1924: Renamed as Apostolic Vicariate of Jehol 熱河
 April 11, 1946: Promoted as Diocese of Jehol 熱河

Leadership
 Bishops of Jehol 熱河 (Roman rite)
 Bishop Joseph Julian Oste, C.I.C.M. (April 9, 1948 – January 19, 1971)
 Bishop Louis Janssens, C.I.C.M. (April 11, 1946 – January 9, 1948)
 Vicars Apostolic of Jehol 熱河 (Roman rite)
 Bishop Louis Janssens, C.I.C.M. (February 4, 1942 – April 11, 1946)
 Bishop Conrad Abels, C.I.C.M. (July 5, 1897 – 1942)
 Vicars Apostolic of Eastern Mongolia 東蒙古
 Bishop Théodore-Herman Rutjes, C.I.C.M. (December 11, 1883 – August 4, 1896 [died])

References

Citations

Bibliography
 
 GCatholic.org
 Catholic Hierarchy

Jehol
Jehol
Jehol
Christianity in Liaoning